Craigenputtock (usually spelled by the Carlyles as Craigenputtoch) is an estate in Scotland where Thomas Carlyle lived from 1828 to 1834.  He wrote several of his early works there, including Sartor Resartus.

The estate's name incorporates the Scots words craig, meaning hill, referring in this case to a whinstone hill, and puttock, or small hawk. Craigenputtock occupies  of farmland in the civil parish of Dunscore in Dumfriesshire, within the District Council Region of Dumfries and Galloway. The principal residence on the grounds is a two-storey, four bedroomed Georgian Country House (category B listed).

It was the property for generations (circa 1500) of the family Welsh, and eventually that of their heiress, Jane Baillie Welsh Carlyle (1801–1866) (descended on the paternal side from Elizabeth, the youngest daughter of John Knox), which the Carlyles made their dwelling-house in 1828, where they remained for seven years (before moving to Carlyle's House in Cheyne Row, London), and where Sartor Resartus was written.  The property was bequeathed by Thomas Carlyle to the Edinburgh University on his death in 1881. It is now home to the Carter-Campbell family, and managed by the C.C.C. (Carlyle Craigenputtock Circle).

Picture gallery

James Paterson on Craigenputtock

The artist James Paterson (one of the "Glasgow Boys") stayed at Craigenputtock in 1882.  The following is his account and sketches of his stay:

See also
 List of country houses in the United Kingdom
 List of places in Dumfries and Galloway

References

External links
 Thomas & Jane Carlyle's Craigenputtock
Historic Houses Association, Scotland
Visit Scotland: Craigenputtock

Thomas Carlyle
Category B listed buildings in Dumfries and Galloway
Listed houses in Scotland
Country houses in Dumfries and Galloway